This is a list of the municipalities in the state of Rio de Janeiro (RJ), located in the Southeast Region of Brazil. Rio de Janeiro is divided into 92 municipalities, which are grouped into 18 microregions, which are grouped into 6 mesoregions.

Note

See also
Geography of Brazil
List of cities in Brazil
Gallery of flags of municipalities of Rio de Janeiro

Rio de Janeiro
Municipalities